The National Office of Statistics (NOS, ONS) is the Algerian ministry charged with the collection and publication of statistics related to the economy, population, and society of Algeria at national and local levels.  Its head office is in Algiers.

History
It was established after the independence of Algeria in 1964, and originally named National Commission for the Census of the Population (CNRP).

In 1966, the office carried out the first census of the Algerian population after the independence of the country. Its missions, as well as its name, have evolved in parallel with the demographic, economic and social evolution of Algeria for which the office collects, processes and publishes statistics in these fields.

References

External links
 National Office of Statistics English page
 
 Publications in English
 National Office of Statistics 

Algeria
Government agencies of Algeria